Three Regentesses and the Binnenmoeder of the Leprozenhuis of Amsterdam is a 1624 oil on panel painting by Werner van den Valckert, now in the Rijksmuseum collection in Amsterdam. It belongs to the regents group portrait genre.

References

Group portraits by Dutch artists
1624 paintings
17th-century portraits
Portraits of women
Paintings in the collection of the Rijksmuseum
Dutch Golden Age paintings